Gittins is a surname. Notable people with the surname include:

Albert Gittins (1897–1977), English cricketer
Anne Gittins (Anne Francis, née Gittins) (1738–1800), English classical scholar and poet
Charles Gittins, American lawyer
Chris Gittins (1902–1988), British character actor, played Walter Gabriel in The Archers
Jack Gittins (1893–1956), English footballer
Jeremy Gittins (born 1956), English actor, played the Vicar on the British sitcom Keeping Up Appearances
John C. Gittins, professor and Emeritus Fellow at Keble College, Oxford University
Paul Gittins, New Zealand actor, played Doctor Michael McKenna in Shortland Street
Rob Gittins, British television and radio writer
Robert H. Gittins (1869–1957), American lawyer, newspaper publisher and politician
Ross Gittins AM (born 1948), Australian political and economic journalist and author
Steve Gittins (1963–2013), darts player from England
Walter Gittins (1865–1890), English professional footballer

See also
Gittins index, measure of the reward that can be achieved by a process evolving from its present state onwards with the probability that it will be terminated in the future